Johnny One-Eye is a 1950 film noir crime film from a story by Damon Runyon, directed by Robert Florey starring Pat O'Brien, Wayne Morris, Dolores Moran and Gayle Reed.

Plot 
In Manhattan, former gangster turned legitimate businessman Martin Martin (Pat O'Brien) has become the target of a politically ambitious district attorney, who has offered immunity for Martin's former partner in crime Dane Cory in exchange for his testimony. After being informed about the deal and narrowly escaping arrest, Martin pays a visit to Cory to persuade him not to testify. The meeting ends up with a shootout, with Martin killing one of Cory's henchmen and being hit himself before fleeing. With his picture on newspaper front pages and a reward on his head, Martin decides to hide in an abandoned house. While recovering to prepare a final assault on Cory, he adopts an injured dog that strays into his hideout and names him Johnny One-Eye.

Cast 
Pat O'Brien as Martin Martin
Wayne Morris as Dane Cory
Dolores Moran as Lily White
 Gayle Reed as Elsie White
Donald Woods as Vet
Barton Hepburn as Cory Henchman
 Raymond Largay as Lawbooks
 Lawrence Cregar as Ambrose
Forrest Taylor as Man on Street who quotes Lord Byron
Lester Allen as Designer-Choreographer
 Jimmy Little as Captain of Police
 Jack Overman as Lippy
Lyle Talbot as Official from District Attorney's Office
 Harry Bronson as Cute Freddy

Soundtrack

External links 

1950 films
American black-and-white films
1950 crime drama films
1950s English-language films
Films directed by Robert Florey
Universal Pictures films
American crime drama films
Film noir
1950s American films